The Men's 800m Freestyle at the 11th FINA World Aquatics Championships occurred on the morning of 26 July 2005 (preliminary heats) and in the evening of 27 July 2005 (final heat) in the Olympic pool at Parc Jean-Drapeau in Montreal, Canada. 45 swimmers were entered in the event, of which 44 swam. The top-8 swimmers from the morning heats advanced to the next day's final heat.

The existing records at the start of the event were:
World record (WR): 7:39.16, Ian Thorpe (Australia), July 24, 2001 in Fukuoka, Japan.
Championship record (CR): same

Results

Final

Heats

See also
Swimming at the 2003 World Aquatics Championships – Men's 800 metre freestyle
Swimming at the 2007 World Aquatics Championships – Men's 800 metre freestyle

References

FINA Worlds 2005: Men's 800 Freestyle heats results from OmegaTiming.com (official timer of the 2005 Worlds). Published 2005-07-30, retrieved 2009-08-21.
FINA Worlds 2005: Men's 800 Freestyle final results from OmegaTiming.com (official timer of the 2005 Worlds). Published 2005-07-30, retrieved 2009-08-21.

Swimming at the 2005 World Aquatics Championships
World Aquatics Championships